Manuel Aurelio Cruz (born December 2, 1953) is a Cuban-born American prelate of the Roman Catholic Church who serves as an auxiliary bishop of the Archdiocese of Newark. He was appointed bishop by Pope Benedict XVI on June 9, 2008.

Biography

Early life 
Manuel Cruz was born in Havana, Cuba on December 2, 1953 to Juan and Caridad Cruz. His family emigrated to the United States in 1966 because of the Cuban Revolution.  The Cruz family lived in Florida before settling in Union City, New Jersey. In his youth, Manual Cruz spent eight years working in the emergency department at Saint James Hospital in Newark, New Jersey. He attended Seton Hall University in South Orange, New Jersey, graduating with a Bachelor of Philosophy degree and a Master of Sacred Scripture degree. He studied for the priesthood at the Immaculate Conception Seminary School of Theology at Seton Hall University.

Priesthood 
Cruz was ordained a priest by Archbishop Peter Gerety for the Archdiocese of Newark on May 31, 1980. He was the first Cuban-born priest ordained in the archdiocese. Following his ordination, Cruz served as parochial vicar at Holy Rosary Parish in Elizabeth, New Jersey. In 1982, he was appointed parochial vicar at the Cathedral of the Sacred Heart Parish in Newark. In 1986, Cruz was appointed to the archdiocesan Vocations Committee by then Archbishop Theodore McCarrick. Cruz served as dean of the deanery from 1991 to 1993. In 2000, Pope John Paul II bestowed on Cruz the honorary title chaplain of his holiness, with the title monsignor.

Since 1995, Cruz has been a faculty member in the Department of Laboratory Medicine and Pathology at the New Jersey Medical School in Newark, New Jersey. In 2005, Archbishop John J. Myers named Cruz vice president for mission and ministry for Catholic Health and Human Services. Cruz has served on the Institutional Review Board of various New Jersey hospitals, the ethics committee of Saint Michael's Medical Center in Newark, and the New Jersey Catholic Conference's Committee on Ethics.

Auxiliary Bishop of Newark
On June 9, 2008, Cruz was appointed as an auxiliary bishop of the Archdiocese of Newark and titular bishop of Gaguari by Pope Benedict XVI. He received his episcopal consecration on September 8, 2008, from Archbishop Myers, with Archbishop Gerety and Bishop David Pérez serving as co-consecrators.Cruz choose a single word for his episcopal motto: Caritas. 

On January 29, 2017 during an afternoon service at the Cathedral Basilica of the Sacred Heart in Newark, Cruz was assaulted by a stranger. Charles Miller, a Newark resident, approached Cruz while he was praying in the sanctuary and punched him in the face, knocking him on the ground. Police at the cathedral immediate arrested Miller and charged him with simple assault.  At the time of his arrest, Miller claimed to be a Protestant pastor. . Cruz was treated at the hospital, receiving 30 stitches on his mouth. The mass was being offered for baseball player Roberto Clemente.

Coat of arms 
Cruz's coat of arms is composed of a shield and a scroll with his motto and external ornamentation. Cruz's arms, which occupy the entire shield, are composed of a silver field on which is placed a red Latin cross superimposed by a blue M for Mary. The shield is completed by the external ornamentation of a Catholic bishop, a gold processional cross behind it and a green galero above it with a green cord and tassels hanging from the galero with six tassels flanking either side of the shield.

See also

 Catholic Church hierarchy
 Catholic Church in the United States
 Historical list of the Catholic bishops of the United States
 List of Catholic bishops of the United States
 Lists of patriarchs, archbishops, and bishops

References

External links
 Archdiocese of Newark

Episcopal succession

1953 births
Living people
Cuban emigrants to the United States
People from Havana
21st-century American Roman Catholic titular bishops
Seton Hall University alumni